Walter Bluhm (5 August 1907 – 2 December 1976) was a German film and television actor.

Partial filmography

 Glückspilze (1935) - Georg Lewaldt
 Hermine und die sieben Aufrechten (1935)
 The Beaver Coat (1937) - Schreiber Glasenapp
 The Muzzle (1938) - Schwefelhölzchen
 Pour le Mérite (1938) - Husar
  (1939) - Sekretär Parker
 Seinerzeit zu meiner Zeit (1944) - Theobald
 The Green Salon (1944) - Oswin, Handlanger
 Der Mann, dem man den Namen stahl (1944) - Ganove & Sänger
 Somewhere in Berlin (1946) - Onkel Kalle
 The Berliner (1948) - West U-Bahn Fahrgast (uncredited)
 The Beaverskin (1949) - Levin
 Master of Life and Death (1955) - Werner Hansen
 Die Ratten (1955)
 Hotel Adlon (1955) - Sekretär Lindström
 Love, Dance and a Thousand Songs (1955) - Fernsehreporter (uncredited)
 You Can No Longer Remain Silent (1955) - Einar
 Das Sandmännchen (1955)
 Dornröschen (1955)
 Alibi (1955) - Justizbeamter (uncredited)
 Studentin Helene Willfüer (1956) - Herr Hörselmann
 Du bist Musik (1956) - Diener Johann
 Liane, Jungle Goddess (1956) - Port Said Rep
 Ein Mann muß nicht immer schön sein (1956) - Theaterregisseur
  (1958) - Arzt
 Aus dem Tagebuch eines Frauenarztes (1959) - Karl Mägerlein
 Old Heidelberg (1959) - Diener Schölermann
  (1960) - Wolke

  (1962) - Portier
 Manhattan Night of Murder (1965) - Billy's Grandpa
 Asterix and Cleopatra (1968) - Numerobis (German version, voice)
 Under the Roofs of St. Pauli (1970) - Schnapsbruder

Bibliography
 Shandley, Robert R. Rubble Films: German Cinema in the Shadow of the Third Reich. Temple University Press, 2001.

External links

1907 births
1976 deaths
German male film actors
Male actors from Berlin
20th-century German male actors